Pateros, officially the Municipality of Pateros, is the lone municipality of Metro Manila, Philippines. According to the 2020 census, it has a population of 63,643 people.

This municipality is famous for its duck-raising industry and especially for producing balut, a Filipino delicacy, which is a boiled, fertilised duck egg. Pateros is also known for the production of red salty eggs and "inutak", a local rice cake. Moreover, the town is known for manufacturing of "alfombra", a locally-made footwear with a carpet-like fabric on its top surface. Pateros is bordered by the following highly urbanized cities of Pasig to the north, Makati to the west, and Taguig to the south.

Pateros is the smallest municipality both in population and in land area, in Metro Manila, but it is the second most densely populated at around 29,000 people per square kilometer after Manila.

Etymology
The name Pateros is most likely derived from the duck-raising industry. The Tagalog word (of Spanish origin) for "duck" is pato and pateros, "duck-raisers". The early 19th-century U.S. diplomat Edmund Roberts used Duck-town, another name for Pateros, stating that he "never before saw so many ducks together" in one place. The duck reference is perfectly suited for Pateros, whose popular culinary specialty is a street food. called Balut (food), a fertilized developing duck embryo that is boiled and eaten from the shell. Several balutans like the famous El Patu at 425 F. Imson Street offer this unique cuisine as well as street merchants selling them on the side of the road.

History

Early Late History

Before 1770, Pateros was only a barrio of Pasig until the Spanish Governor-General of the Philippines issued a decree making Pateros an independent municipality. The town was then composed of five barangays (villages): Aguho, San Roque, Santa Ana, Santo Rosario (Santo Rosario-Silangan and Santo Rosario-Kanluran), and Mamancat (now part of Fort Bonifacio).

1899 Philippine-American War

During the Philippine–American War in March 1899, the first contingent of American Volunteers from Washington arrived in the town of Pateros. The American soldiers rallied and eventually won the battles to take control and establish a temporary camp. Throughout this period, American soldiers were able to experience the culture and livelihood of the citizens of Pateros. Having roast duck for meals during wartime and sending postcards of Pateros back to the United States of America. In 1900, a member of the American contingent, Lieutenant Charles Nosler, renamed the city of Ive's Landing in Washington State, USA, after the town of Pateros in the Philippines. Pateros in Washington State officially became an American city on May 1, 1913.

Inclusion to newly created province of Rizal
On March 29, 1900, Pateros, then a part of the province of Manila, became one of the towns in the newly created province of Rizal, by virtue of General Order No. 40, Act No. 137 of the Philippine Commission, which was promulgated on June 11, 1901. Then on October 12, 1903, Act No. 942 united Pateros with Taguig and Muntinlupa into one municipality under Pateros. The municipality was renamed Taguig and Muntinlupa was separated from it on March 22, 1905, through Act No. 1308.

Executive Order No. 20 dated February 29, 1908, partitioned Pateros from Taguig, and the town regained independent status as a municipality on January 1, 1909, by Executive Order No. 36.

Incorporation to Metropolitan Manila
On November 7, 1975, Pateros became a part of the new Metropolitan Manila Area through Presidential Decree No. 824

International partnership
On July 23, 2013, Mayor Jaime C. Medina visited the city of Pateros, Washington State, United States to sign the Sister City Memorandum of Understanding between the Municipality of Pateros, Metro Manila and Pateros City of Okanogan County, Washington State, USA. According to Mayor Gail Howe, the two cities have not applied through Sister Cities International but the goals of promoting the culture and exchanges have turned the sisterhood into reality.

Conversion to cityhood attempt
The Inauguration of Rodrigo Duterte to presidency that took place on June 30, 2016, paved way to another attempt of the conversion of the town into a city and constituting into two congressional districts through the collaborative efforts of the municipal government of Pateros spearheaded by Mayor Miguel Ponce III and the most especially by the passage of a house bill sponsored by Pateros-Taguig Representative Arnel Cerafica.

Geography

Climate

Barangays
Pateros is politically subdivided into 10 barangays:

Boundary dispute
The municipal government of Pateros claims that its original land area was not its present land area of  but  including Fort Bonifacio, particularly the Embo barangays Comembo, Pembo, East Rembo, West Rembo, Cembo, South Cembo and Pitogo which are now part of the city of Makati and Bonifacio Global City (known as Post Proper Northside and Post Proper Southside by Makati, and Mamancat, Masilang, San Nicolas, and Malapadnabato, former parts of Pateros) which was made part of Taguig, based on documents and official maps obtained by former Pateros Councilor Dominador Rosales from 30 libraries and offices including USA Library of Congress and USA Archives. One of those maps was the 1968 Land Classification Map of the Bureau of Land.

Pateros' decrease in territory was accounted to a cadastral mapping in Metro Manila conducted in 1978. Pateros Mayor Nestor Ponce challenged the map through an objection letter dated June 23, 1978.  But in January 1986, then President Ferdinand Marcos issued Proclamation No. 2475 which stated that Fort Bonifacio is situated in Makati and it is open for disposition. Because of that, a boundary dispute arose which moved Pateros to request a dialogue about that with then Municipal Council of Makati in 1990. Pateros also filed a complaint against Makati at the Makati Regional Trial Court in 1996 but the trial court dismissed the case for lack of jurisdiction. The case was brought to the Court of Appeals in 2003 but the case was also denied. The same case was also elevated to the Supreme Court in 2009 but it was denied again.

Supreme Court decision
Almost 2 decades later, the Supreme Court on June 16, 2009, per Antonio Eduardo B. Nachura denied Pateros' petition against Makati but ruled out that the boundary dispute should be settled amicably by their respective legislative bodies based on Section 118(d) of the Local Government Code. Pursuant to the decision, Pateros invited Makati to a council-to-council dialogue. This happened on October 8, 2009. Four meetings were held and at the fourth dialogue on November 23, 2009, a joint resolution was made stating that Makati is requesting a tripartite conference between Pateros, Taguig and Makati.

Demographics

As of 1818, the population was estimated at 3,840 Tagalog peoples. When Edmund Roberts visited in 1834, he estimated approximately 4,500 residents.

According to the town's 2005 land use classification report 91.62% of Pateros'  land is classified as residential.

Economy

The town of Pateros is known for balut and had a duck raising industry. As early as 1834, Pateros has been raising and selling duck and maintaining a fishing industry. Due to the water pollution on the Pateros River which connects to the Pasig River, the duck raising industry declined around the 1970s or 1980s.

Vendors continues to sell balut in Pateros, taking advantage of the association of the food item to the town with duck eggs supplied from neighboring provinces in the Calabarzon region. While the duck raising industry in the town is now minimal, the local government is encouraging the growth of the balut industry. It gives tax exemptions to balut vendors in the town. As of 2017, the local government is encouraging the growth of other industries in Pateros such as business process outsourcing although the town's size, remains a hindrance.

According to the town's 2005 classification report. 3.13% of its land area is classified as commercial, 0.39% industrial, and 0.88% agricultural.

Government

Official seal

Pateros (Mallard) Duck, symbolizes the duck-raising industry where town was known.
 Ten duck eggs represents the barangay which Pateros was politically subdivided; it also signifies the Balut industry of the town.

Education

The following are the different Elementary and High schools in Pateros under Pateros School District of the Department of Education – Schools Division of Taguig and Pateros, a Community college recognized by Commission on Higher Education.

Secondary public schools
Secondary Institutions
Mayor Simplicio Manalo National High School
Maria Concepcion Cruz High School
  Pateros National High School

Tertiary
 Pateros Technological College

Private schools
APEC Schools - Pateros (Santo Rosario-Silangan)
  Pateros Catholic School
  Saint Genevieve School of Pateros
  Maranatha Christian Academy
  SEP Christian School Inc.
  Huckleberry Montessori School

Notable personalities

 Pelagia Mendoza y Gotianquin -  first female sculptor in the Philippines and was the first female student at the Escuela de Dibujo y Pintura (Drawing and Painting School).
 Socrates Villegas - Bishop of Balanga (July 3, 2004 – November 4, 2009), Archbishop of Lingayen-Dagupan (November 4, 2009–present), Former CBCP President
 Pete Lacaba - poet, writer and journalist
 Emmanuel Lacaba - poet, writer and activist 
 Jimmy Santos - Filipino Actor, PBA Basketball Player, and TV Host, Eat Bulaga!
 Berting Labra - Actor, Side kick of FPJ
 Daisy Reyes - Beauty Queen, Actress

Sister cities
International and Local sister cities:

Local
 Taguig, Metro Manila
 Pasig, Metro Manila

International
  Pateros, Washington, U.S.

See also
 San Roque Parish Church
 Santa Marta de Pateros

References

External links

Municipality of Pateros official website
Municipality of Pateros official website

 
Municipalities of Metro Manila
Populated places established in 1770
1770 establishments in the Philippines